Meadow Brook Club may refer to:
 Meadow Brook Golf Club, a private golf club in Jericho, Long Island, New York
 Meadowbrook Polo Club, the oldest continuously operating polo club in the United States

See also
 Meadowbrook Country Club (disambiguation)